William "Bill" Richardson (December 26, 1951 - March 25, 1997) was a teacher and politician from Indianola, Mississippi who served in the Mississippi House of Representatives from 1993 until his death in 1997.

Background and early career 
Born December 26, 1951 in Indianola, Richardson was educated in schools of the Indianola School District. He received a bachelor's degree from Mississippi Valley State University, and pursued graduate studies there and at the 
University of Southern Mississippi. He taught social studies and civics in the Indianola School District for almost 20 years. He was active in various civic organizations, including the National Education Association and the National Association for the Advancement of Colored People.

Legislative career 
In 1992, he was elected to the 31st district of the Mississippi State House of Representatives as a Democrat. He served on the Committee on Education, the Committee on Agriculture and the Joint 
Legislative Parole Commission; and during the legislature's 1995 session was elected sergeant-at-arms of the Mississippi Legislative Black Caucus. He died of cancer in 1997, and was succeeded in the House by his aunt, Sara Thomas.

References

1951 births
Democratic Party members of the Mississippi House of Representatives
People from Indianola, Mississippi
20th-century American politicians
African-American state legislators in Mississippi
African-American schoolteachers
Schoolteachers from Mississippi
University of Southern Mississippi alumni
Mississippi Valley State University alumni
1997 deaths
20th-century African-American politicians